Royal Charters and Royal Patronage were historically granted to organisations in Ireland by the Monarch of Ireland when Ireland was part of the Kingdom of Ireland and later the United Kingdom of Great Britain and Ireland. Since the Irish Independence from the United Kingdom as the Irish Free State in 1922 and the abolition of the monarchy by the Constitution of Ireland in 1937 and the Republic of Ireland Act 1948 no new Royal Charters in Ireland have been granted.

Despite the end of the monarchy in Ireland, several organisations based in the Republic of Ireland have retained the "Royal" element in their names. The continued used of this naming style in Ireland is sometimes questioned by commentators as being outdated and a reminder of a colonial past.

See also List of organisations with a British royal charter, which includes organisations throughout the world.

Bodies with "Royal" in their names

Royal British Legion - Republic of Ireland branch 
Royal Academy of Medicine in Ireland
Royal Anthropological Institute of Great Britain and Ireland
Royal Asiatic Society of Great Britain and Ireland
Royal Alfred Yacht Club
Royal and Prior School 
Royal College of Physicians of Ireland
Royal College of General Practitioners - (Republic of Ireland Faculty)
Royal College of Surgeons in Ireland
Royal Commonwealth Society Ireland Branch (RCS Ireland) 
Royal Cork Yacht Club
Royal Curragh Golf Club
Royal Dublin Golf Club
Royal Dublin Society
Royal Hibernian Academy
Royal Hospital Donnybrook
Royal Horticultural Society of Ireland
Royal Institution of Chartered Surveyors
Royal Institute of the Architects of Ireland
Royal Irish Academy of Music
Royal Irish Academy
Royal Irish Automobile Club
Royal Irish Yacht Club
Royal National Lifeboat Institution (Ireland Region)
Royal St. George Yacht Club
Royal School Cavan
Royal Society of Antiquaries of Ireland
Royal Town Planning Institute - (RTPI Ireland)
Royal Western Yacht Club of Ireland
Royal Victoria Eye and Ear Hospital

Other bodies with Royal Charters

The Honorable Society of King's Inns established by Royal Charter in 1541
Dublin University incorporating Trinity College, Dublin with a founding charter of 1592
University College Cork, (formerly Queen's College Cork) - granted Royal Charter in 1845
National University of Ireland, Galway, (formerly Queen's College Galway) - granted Royal Charter in 1849
Institution of Engineers of Ireland, Granted Royal Charter 1877

Former bodies

Royal Bank of Ireland - merged with AIB in 1970
Royal City of Dublin Hospital
Royal College of Science for Ireland - Absorbed into University College Dublin in 1926.
Royal Cork Institution
Royal Geological Society of Ireland
Royal Hospital Kilmainham
Royal Hibernian Marine School
Royal Hibernian Military School
Royal Munster Yacht Club -  Merged with Royal Cork Yacht Club in 1966
Royal Veterinary College of Ireland - merged into University College Dublin in 1977.
Royal Zoological Society of Ireland - Renamed as the Zoological Society of Ireland in 1993.

See also

 List of organisations in the United Kingdom with a royal charter
 List of Australian organisations with royal patronage
 List of Canadian organizations with royal patronage
 List of New Zealand organisations with royal patronage

References

Royal patronage
Organisations, Ireland
Organisations, Royal patronage
Ireland and the Commonwealth of Nations
Royal